The Acanti are a race of fictional whale-like, extraterrestrial beings appearing in American comic books published by Marvel Comics. They have appeared in Uncanny X-Men within the Marvel Comics universe. They were created by writer Chris Claremont and artist Dave Cockrum. Many of them were enslaved by the Brood empire.

Physical characteristics
The Acanti roughly resemble whales. They are a reddish-brown color. They have dorsal, ventral, lateral, and caudal fins, as well as green eyes widely spaced on their heads. The Acanti are large space-faring creatures most closely resembling Earth's whale shark. An adult Acanti can grow to a few kilometers in length, and even an infant is large enough to swallow a 15-person spaceship with room to take in at least four more. They are sentient creatures which communicate through psionic sounds referred to as songs. Acanti have the innate ability to fly faster than the speed of light, without technological assistance.

Fictional race biography
According to myth, the Acanti are an ancient species which peacefully wandered through space, benevolent and compassionate by nature. The Acanti were led by one individual known as the Prophet-Singer. The Prophet-Singer was the repository of the Acanti's racial Soul, a collective semi-mystical force that linked and motivated the Acanti species. As death approached, the Acanti typically hurled themselves into stars. The Prophet-Singer of each generation would also do so, releasing the Soul to join the body of the next Prophet-Singer.

Upon migrating to the Milky Way galaxy, the Brood began to enslave the Acanti to take advantage of their natural ability to travel at speeds exceeding light. The Brood would infect individual Acanti with a disease known as the Slaver Virus, which would destroy the higher cognitive functions of their minds, making them ripe for easy control. Then, the Brood would transform the mindless husks into living starships. The Brood succeeded in enslaving the Acanti Prophet-Singer, and when he eventually died and crashed on a planet, its body was reconstructed as the "throne city" (presumably like a capital) on the planet (referred to as "Broodworld" or "Sleazeworld") that the Brood then established as the center of their empire. Thus, the Soul remained trapped in the skull of the dead Prophet-Singer.

Salvation for the Acanti came when a new Prophet-Singer was born, however, without transferring the soul to him, the Acanti were still stuck near Sleazeworld. During the X-Men's first conflict with the Brood the X-Men had been abducted and infected by the Brood and brought to their homeworld. Carol Danvers (formerly Ms. Marvel) became linked with a white hole and transformed into Binary. The process made her temporarily insane, and she blasted out of Lilandra's yacht, causing an explosive decompression that sucked Storm into space, where she was found by the newborn Prophet-Singer, whose mother had just been enslaved by the Brood. Storm herself was now becoming a Brood as the egg began to hatch. The Prophet-Singer saved Storm (who had destroyed the egg and critically wounded herself). Other Acanti merged Storm's consciousness with that of the Prophet-Singer while Storm's body healed in a cocoon within him.

The Acanti saved Storm, entering into a symbiotic relationship in which the Acanti healed Storm's body, purging it of the Brood embryo, and Storm's experienced mind provided a source of focus and strength for the baby Prophet-Singer. The Acanti then swallowed Liliandra's yacht, masking it from Brood sensors while the crew effected repairs.

The X-Men then agreed to release the Soul from Broodworld. After a battle against the Brood, Binary succeeded in releasing the Soul from the crystalline room in which it was trapped. The foul nature of the Brood Queen and the embryos within the X-Men immediately resonated as black pools throughout the chamber. The grateful Soul purged the X-Men of the Brood embryos and transformed the Brood Queen into pure inanimate crystal. The Soul united with the young Prophet-Singer, who assumed leadership of the Acanti.

Recently, however, the Brood attempted to invade Earth using a fleet of Acanti ships, though ones without external domes. It is unknown whether these were leftovers from before the X-Men freed the Prophet-Singer, or whether the Brood have continued their depredations on the Acanti even afterwards. The fleet was scared away from Earth with a telepathic illusion of the Phoenix Force and Galactus.

One Acanti was obtained by Roxxon Energy Corporation. With a riding device added to it, the Acanti was controlled by an unidentified Brood-infected human working for Dario Agger in his plot to hire Weapon H into working for Roxxon. Weapon H used his punch to defeat the Acanti.

Ultimate Marvel
Although not named, in the Ultimate Fantastic Four #35 (Dec. 2006)
there is a huge alien creature, used by the Acheron Empire, ruled by Thanos, that resembles the Acanti.

Other media
An Acanti appears in the X-Men episode "Love in Vain". Enslaved by the Brood (here called "The Colony") to be their vessel, it is freed when Professor X uses his psychic powers to break the Brood's control. The Brood cannot stand the Acanti's song while the X-Man Rogue finds it beautiful.

References

Characters created by Chris Claremont
Characters created by Dave Cockrum